Devin Goda (born May 5, 1989) is an American male model and former professional American football player.

Biography 

Goda was born on May 5, 1989, in Monongahela, Pennsylvania.  His childhood was spent on his grandparents' farm.

Goda attended Slippery Rock University of Pennsylvania, where he played college football as a wide receiver. He was the second-leading receiver in the school's history, finishing his career with 173 receptions and 2,259 receiving yards. He signed with the Baltimore Ravens of the National Football League (NFL) as an undrafted free agent on May 11, 2012. He suffered a hamstring injury during training camp and was waived before the start of the regular season on August 26, 2012.

Goda subsequently decided to pursue a modeling career. He appeared in national campaigns for Macy's, Under Armour, and Calvin Klein. In 2018, Goda joined The Price Is Right, serving as the third permanent male model on the American version of the show. He splits his time between New York and Los Angeles.

See also 

 The Price Is Right models
 Wilhelmina Models

References

External links 

 Devin Goda, Biography, The Price is Right
 

1989 births
American football wide receivers
Baltimore Ravens players
Game show models
Living people
Male models
Slippery Rock football players